Amsterdamse Poort may refer to:

 Amsterdam Gate, Jakarta, a gate in Jakarta, Indonesia
 Amsterdamse Poort, Haarlem, a city gate of Haarlem, the Netherlands
 Amsterdamse Poort (shopping centre)